Deir ez-Zor District is a district of the Deir ez-Zor Governorate in northeastern Syria. The administrative centre is the city of Deir ez-Zor. At the 2004 census, the district had a population of 492,434.

Subdistricts 
The district of Deir ez-Zor is divided into seven subdistricts or nawāḥī (population as of 2004):
Deir ez-Zor Subdistrict (ناحية دير الزور): population 239,196.
Al-Kasrah Subdistrict (ناحية الكسرة): population 63,226.
Al-Busayrah Subdistrict (ناحية البصيرة): population 40,236.
Al-Muhasan Subdistrict (ناحية الموحسن): population 35,113.
Al-Tabni Subdistrict (ناحيةالتبني): population 48,393.
Khasham Subdistrict (ناحية خشام): population 28,718.
Al-Suwar Subdistrict (ناحية الصور): population 37,552.

References 

 
Districts of Deir ez-Zor Governorate